IN3, or similar, may refer to:
 cubic inch (in3), a unit of volume
 Indiana State Road 3, a road in the eastern part of the U.S. state of Indiana.
 Indiana's 3rd congressional district, a congressional district in the U.S. state of Indiana
 Internet Interdisciplinary Institute, the research body of the Open University of Catalonia